Re-Logic is an American independent game developer and publisher based in Indiana. It was founded by Andrew Spinks in 2011. The company is best known for developing and publishing Terraria, a 2D action-adventure sandbox video game. Re-Logic published Pixel Piracy and Pixel Privateers, both were developed by Quadro Delta.

History 
Re-Logic was founded at the beginning of Terrarias development cycle, starting in January 2011, by Andrew Spinks. The game was released for Microsoft Windows on 16 May 2011 and received multiple updates later on. In February 2012, Re-Logic's developers announced that Terraria would be receiving one final bug-fix patch, but development resumed in 2013. At E3 2019, Re-Logic announced the final update to the game. Update 1.4 Journey's End was released on 16 May 2020. Re-Logic stated that they wanted to work on other projects after this update. 

Terraria has seen multiple console releases, which include the PlayStation 3 on 26 March 2013, Xbox 360 on 27 March 2013, the PlayStation Vita on 11 December 2013, the PlayStation 4 on 11 November 2014, the Xbox One on 14 November 2014, the Nintendo 3DS on 10 December 2015, and the Wii U in June 2016. The game was also released for iOS on 29 August 2013, for Android on 13 September 2013, and for Windows Phone on 12 September 2014. 

The company published Pixel Piracy, a side-scrolling real-time strategy video game, for Windows, macOS, and Linux on 1 December 2013, for the PlayStation 4 on 16 February 2016, and for the Xbox One on 16 February 2016. On 21 February 2017 Re-Logic published Pixel Privateers, a turn-based strategy video game for Windows. 

In February 2015, Re-Logic began development of Terraria: Otherworld, a game set in the same universe as Terraria. The game was announced in a teaser trailer on 16 February 2015, however, on 13 April 2018, the game was cancelled due it being far behind schedule and far from the vision Re-Logic had for it.

In 2019, in response to the increasing number of games becoming exclusive to the Epic Games Store, Re-Logic's vice president Whitney Spinks asserted that no Re-Logic titles would become Epic Games Store exclusives, adding that the company would never "sell [their] souls" for any amount of money.

In 2021, Andrew Spinks had a public falling out with Google over the unexplained suspension of Re-Logic/Spinks's Google account over three weeks prior, losing access to his YouTube channel, Gmail, and Google Drive. He announced that as a result, Terraria would not be coming to Stadia and that Re-Logic will not release any new projects on Google platforms in the future. A month later, Re-Logic settled with Google on the suspension of Spinks's Google account and confirms that Terraria will be heading to Stadia.

Games

Developed 
 Terraria (2011)

Published 
 Pixel Piracy (2015)
 Pixel Privateers (2017)

References

External links 
 

American companies established in 2011
Video game companies established in 2011
Indie video game developers
Privately held companies based in Indiana
Video game companies of the United States
2011 establishments in Indiana
Video game development companies